GTV Variety Show is a television channel of the  Gala Television Corporation in Taiwan. It mainly broadcasts Taiwanese drama and cartoons.

See also
 Media of Taiwan

References

Television stations in Taiwan
Television channels and stations established in 1999
1999 establishments in Taiwan